Jennie Alexander (December 8, 1930 – July 12, 2018) was an American woodworker considered a pioneer in the woodworking world, "Instrumental in designing the now iconic two-slat post-and-rung shaving chair,". She also coined the term "greenwoodworking" as a single word in her book, Make a Chair from a Tree: An Introduction to Working Green Wood.

Background
Jennie Alexander spent her early childhood in Baltimore, Maryland learning to play the piano and later became a Jazz musician. She was introduced to woodworking at the Baltimore polytechnic institute High School and would later go on to open up her own home shop in 1960.

Her mother grew up in Quincy, Massachusetts, and was part of the educational sloyd system. Because of this Jennie was always encouraged to explore woodworking and learning through doing. Her father was a lawyer, and Jennie also attended law school at the university of Maryland, becoming a divorce lawyer. She embraced greenwoodworking as an avocation. She both practiced greenwoodworking, and studied the history of greenwoodworking by examining furniture at museums, private collections, auction houses, etc.

Born as John David Alexander Jr., Alexander was a trans woman who transitioned in 2007, at the age of 77.   Alexander's wife, Joyce, died in 1996. The couple had three daughters. Jennie Alexander has five grandchildren and three great-grandchildren; one of whom is John D. Alexander III.

Career 
In 1978, Alexander wrote, Make a Chair from a Tree: An Introduction to Working Green Wood, which was the first woodworking book published by Taunton Press. This book describes the process and tools required to construct a shaved two-slat post-and-rung chair without the use of a wood lathe. She became a member of the Early American Industries Association (EAIA) which was a crucial step in her exploration of  woodworking and chair making as it gave her access to collections of joined furniture. She also demonstrated how to make the shaved two-slat post-and-rung chair at an event hosted by EAIA. She later taught classes at Drew Langsner's Country Workshops in North Carolina and mentored many students.

At Country Workshops she met Peter Follansbee, and after years of corresponding, would go on to co write a book with him called, Make a Joint Stool from a Tree: An Introduction to 17th-Century Joinery. She spent her later years mentoring many in greenwoodworking techniques and joinery. Jennie died July 12, 2018.

Two-slat post-and-rung shaving chair 
Jennie Alexander had attributed the success of the post-and-rung shaving chair to her wife, who after Jennie was told she could not wood turn in front of a live audience, encouraged Jennie to make the same chair by shaving all the parts close to round without a lathe. Jennie said, “So the shaving, really, made the existence of the post-and-rung chair a reality in this country.”

From her book, Make a Chair from a Tree: An Introduction to Working Green Wood:

This chair differs in part from the Windsor chair because it does not have a solid carved seat. In a Ladderback Chair, the seat is not structural. Where in a Windsor chair, the seat is structural - all the legs, back and arms terminate in the seat.

Education 
 High School Baltimore City Polytechnic Institute
 St. John's College
 University of Maryland

Publications 
 Make a Chair from a Tree: An Introduction to Working Green Wood 
 Make a joint stool from a tree, an introduction to 17th-century joinery (co written with Peter Follansbee)

See also 
 Woodturning
 Woodworking
 Joiner
 Sloyd
 List of chairs

References

External links 
 

1930 births
Transgender women
American woodworkers
Transgender writers
20th-century American non-fiction writers
2018 deaths
Artists from Baltimore